Thomas Walsh Prest (4 February 1908 – 1987) was an English professional footballer who played as an inside forward.

References

1908 births
1987 deaths
People from Darwen
English footballers
Association football forwards
Burnley F.C. players
Brighton & Hove Albion F.C. players
Aldershot F.C. players
Rochdale A.F.C. players
English Football League players